Jacobine Veenhoven (born 30 January 1984, Laren) is a Dutch female rower. She won the bronze medal at the 2012 Summer Olympics in the women's eight event.

References 

1984 births
Living people
Dutch female rowers
Olympic rowers of the Netherlands
Rowers at the 2012 Summer Olympics
Olympic bronze medalists for the Netherlands
Olympic medalists in rowing
Sportspeople from Laren, North Holland
Medalists at the 2012 Summer Olympics
20th-century Dutch women
21st-century Dutch women